Leon Litinetsky (born 2 August 1967) is an Israeli politician. He served as a member of the Knesset for the Labor Party between 2008 and 2009, and for Yisrael Beiteinu between 2014 and 2015.

Biography
Born in Kazan in the Soviet Union, Litinetsky studied medicine at Kazan State University between 1984 and 1990, but did not graduate as he emigrated to Israel on 1 January 1991. Between 1995 and 1997 he studied at the ORT College in Kfar Saba, before studying political science at Tel Aviv University.

In 1995 he became a member of the Worker's Committee of the Israel Electric Corporation. In 1999 he became an assembly member of the Histadrut and chairman of the National Organisation for Russian-speaking Israelis. In 2000 he was a delegate to the World Zionist Congress.

In 2017-2019, Litinetzky initiated and managed the project to erect a "Candle of Remembrance monument" in Jerusalem, in memory of Jews killed in the Nazi siege of Leningrad in World War II, and commemorates the heroic deeds of Leningrad residents and defenders - Red Army soldiers in the siege, during the war against the Nazis. The opening of the monument took place on January 23, 2020, in the Sucker Park in Jerusalem, in the presence of Russian President Vladimir Putin, Israeli Prime Minister Benjamin Netanyahu and President Reuven Rivlin.

Litinetsky currently lives in Kfar Saba, and is married to Luba with one child, Roni.

Political career
Litinetsky was placed ninth on the One Nation list for the 2003 Knesset elections. However, the party won only three seats. In 2005 the party merged into the Labor Party, and Litinetsky was placed 21st on the Labor-Meimad list for the 2006 elections. Although the party won 19 seats, Litinetsky entered the Knesset on 2 July 2008 as a replacement for Danny Yatom who had resigned to go into business.

Placed 18th on the party's list, he lost his seat in the 2009 elections as Labor was reduced to 13 seats. In the 2013 elections, he ran on the joint Likud Yisrael Beitenu list. Although he failed to win a seat, he entered the Knesset on 5 November 2014 as a replacement for Gideon Sa'ar. He was placed twelfth on the Yisrael Beiteinu list for the 2015 elections, losing his seat when the party was reduced to six seats.

During the negotiations on the entry of Yisrael Beiteinu into the thirty-fourth Israeli government in May 2016, Litinetsky was a member of the negotiating team on behalf of Yisrael Beiteinu, and during his discussions he was responsible for the reform of increasing old age pension in Israel.

Honours and awards
  Order of Friendship (Russia, 21 August 2020).

References

External links

1967 births
Living people
Russian Jews
Kazan Federal University alumni
Russian emigrants to Israel
Tel Aviv University alumni
Israeli Labor Party politicians
Yisrael Beiteinu politicians
Members of the 17th Knesset (2006–2009)
Members of the 19th Knesset (2013–2015)